Adam Paul Ebbin (born November 10, 1963) is an American politician who is the senator from the 30th District of the Virginia Senate since January 2012. A member of the Democratic Party, he was the Delegate from the 49th District of the Virginia House of Delegates from 2004 to 2012.

As an openly gay man, Ebbin has made history several times through his electoral success. In 2003, he became the first out LGBT person elected to the Virginia House of Delegates and the Virginia General Assembly. In 2011 he became the first out LGBT person elected to the Virginia Senate.

Ebbin is one of four LGBT people serving in the Virginia General Assembly (alongside Mark Sickles, Dawn Adams, and Danica Roem).

Early life
A 1985 graduate of the American University in Washington, D.C., Ebbin was a Fellow at the University of Virginia's Sorensen Institute of Political Leadership in 2000. A longtime Democratic Party activist, Ebbin spent a decade on the party's state central committee and was a delegate to both the 2000 and 2004 Democratic national conventions. In 2012, Ebbin completed Harvard University's John F. Kennedy School of Government program for Senior Executives in State and Local Government as a David Bohnett LGBTQ Victory Institute Leadership Fellow.

House of Delegates
He first sought the 49th district seat in 2003, narrowly winning a five-person Democratic primary and facing no Republican opponent in the general election. He took office in January 2004 and was re-elected unopposed in 2005. Ebbin faced only an Independent Green opponent in 2007, winning easily, and ran unopposed in 2009. The district includes a large part of South Arlington, the Del Ray and Arlandria portions of the City of Alexandria and parts of Bailey's Crossroads in Fairfax County.

State Senate 
Ebbin decided to give up his seat in the House of Delegates to run for the Virginia State Senate in 2011, following Patsy Ticer's announcement that she would not seek re-election. He ran in the 30th district, comprising parts of Arlington, Alexandria and Fairfax County; the district leans heavily Democratic.

He faced a heated Democratic primary election held on August 23, 2011, with two opponents: Rob Krupicka, a member of the Alexandria city council, and Libby Garvey, a member of the Arlington school board. Krupicka, who led in fundraising, was widely considered the favorite but Ebbin prevailed narrowly in what local newspapers called an "upset" and a "shocker". Ebbin took 39% of the vote to Krupicka's 36% and Garvey's 25% – a margin of 335 votes. The 30th district race was the second most expensive primary in the state, with the three Democratic candidates raising a combined $746,000. In the general election, Ebbin faced Republican candidate Tim McGhee and prevailed easily. He took office as a Virginia state senator on January 11, 2012.

Ebbin serves on five Senate committees: Finance and Appropriations; Commerce and Labor; Privileges & Elections; General Laws and Technology; and the Transportation Committee. He serves on a number of Commissions and interim Committees including the Task Force to Commemorate the Centennial Anniversary of Women's Right to Vote, the Joint Commission on Administrative Rules, the Northern Virginia Transportation Commission, and the Joint Subcommittee to Evaluate Taxation Preferences. Adam also serves as the Vice-Chairman of the Joint Commission on Technology and Science and as the Co-Chair of the General Assembly Gun Violence Prevention Caucus.

During the 2020 Legislative Session Adam passed legislation including: The Virginia Values Act, a landmark bill to provide nondiscrimination protections in housing, employment, and public accommodations for LGBT Virginians. He also passed legislation to decriminalize marijuana, allow localities to institute fees on throw away bags, and create a legal avenue for employees to sue their employers for wage theft. In 2021, Ebbin passed legislation legalizing the simple possession of cannabis and was appointed Chair of the General Assembly Cannabis Oversight Commission, which oversees the structuring of the proposed legal market for adult use cannabis in Virginia.

During the 2022 legislative session, Ebbin was elected Chair of the Senate Privileges and Elections Committee, becoming the second out LGBT official to serve as a General Assembly Committee Chair.

2014 Congressional Campaign 
On January 30, 2014, Ebbin announced his candidacy in the Democratic primary for the 8th Congressional district seat being vacated by Congressman Jim Moran. The 8th Congressional District is Virginia's most Democratic district, with a Cook Partisan Voting Index of D+21, and one of the most Democratic white-majority districts in the South. The heavily contested Democratic primary drew a number of challengers, including former Lt. Governor Don Beyer, State Delegate Patrick Hope, former Northern Virginia Urban League Chief Lavern Chatman, mayor of Alexandria William D. Euille, radio-talk show host Mark Levine, and Virginia Tech professor Derek Hyra. Ebbin finished third in the June 10, 2014 Democratic primary with 6,262 votes, while Beyer won the primary with 17,783 votes. Beyer went on to win the general election on November 7, 2014.

Personal 
A former president of the Virginia Partisans Gay & Lesbian Democratic Club, Ebbin was the third openly gay elected official in Virginia and the first ever openly gay member of the Virginia General Assembly. His campaigns have won the backing of the Gay & Lesbian Victory Fund. He was previously employed by the Servicemembers Legal Defense Network as its Director of Communications.

Electoral History

References

External links 

 
Legislative homepage
Virginia Public Access Project: Adam Ebbin

American University alumni
Gay politicians
LGBT state legislators in Virginia
Living people
Democratic Party members of the Virginia House of Delegates
People from Arlington County, Virginia
People from Huntington, New York
Democratic Party Virginia state senators
1963 births
21st-century American politicians
21st-century LGBT people